Down and Out in Beverly Hills is an American sitcom based on the 1986 movie of the same name. It aired from April 26 to September 12, 1987 on the fledgling Fox network. It has the distinction of being the first ever show to be cancelled by Fox; 5 of the 13 produced episodes did not air.

The cast included Hector Elizondo as Dave Whiteman (Richard Dreyfuss' character in the movie), Anita Morris as Barbara Whiteman (Bette Midler's character in the movie), Eileen Seeley as Jenny Whiteman (Tracy Nelson's character in the movie), April Ortiz as Carmen the Maid (Elizabeth Peña's character from the movie), and Tim Thomerson as Jerry Baskin (Nick Nolte's character in the movie). Evan Richards (Max Whiteman) was the only cast member of the film to reprise his role for TV.

Cast
Hector Elizondo as Dave Whiteman
Anita Morris as Barbara Whiteman
Evan Richards as Max Whiteman
Eileen Seeley as Jenny Whiteman
Tim Thomerson as Jerry Baskin
April Ortiz as Carmen

Episodes

References

External links

1987 American television series debuts
1987 American television series endings
1980s American sitcoms
Fox Broadcasting Company original programming
Live action television shows based on films
Television series based on adaptations
Television series by ABC Studios
Television shows set in Beverly Hills, California